The parallelogram of forces is a method for solving (or visualizing) the results of applying two forces to an object.

When more than two forces are involved, the geometry is no longer parallelogrammatic, but the same principles apply.  Forces, being vectors are observed to obey the laws of vector addition, and so the overall (resultant) force due to the application of a number of forces can be found geometrically by drawing vector arrows for each force. For example, see Figure 1. This construction has the same result as moving F2 so its tail coincides with the head of F1, and taking the net force as the vector joining the tail of F1 to the head of F2. This procedure can be repeated to add F3 to the resultant F1 + F2, and so forth.

Newton's proof

Preliminary: the parallelogram of velocity 
Suppose a particle moves at a uniform rate along a line from A to B (Figure 2) in a given time (say, one second), while in the same time, the line AB moves uniformly from its position at AB to a position at DC, remaining parallel to its original orientation throughout. Accounting for both motions, the particle traces the line AC. Because a displacement in a given time is a measure of velocity, the length of AB is a measure of the particle's velocity along AB, the length of AD is a measure of the line's velocity along AD, and the length of AC is a measure of the particle's velocity along AC. The particle's motion is the same as if it had moved with a single velocity along AC.

Newton's proof of the parallelogram of force 
Suppose two forces act on a particle at the origin (the "tails" of the vectors) of Figure 1. Let the lengths of the vectors F1 and F2 represent the velocities the two forces could produce in the particle by acting for a given time, and let the direction of each represent the direction in which they act. Each force acts independently and will produce its particular velocity whether the other force acts or not. At the end of the given time, the particle has both velocities. By the above proof, they are equivalent to a single velocity, Fnet. By Newton's second law, this vector is also a measure of the force which would produce that velocity, thus the two forces are equivalent to a single force.

Bernoulli's proof for perpendicular vectors

Our first assumption is that the resultant of two forces is in fact another force, so that for any two forces  there is another force .

Our final assumption is that the resultant of two forces doesn't change when rotated.

Under the invariance of the rotation, we get

Applying these two equations

Since  and  both lie along , their lengths are equal 

Using this additional assumption, we will form an additional proof below.

Algebraic proof of the parallelogram of force
Our first assumption is that the resultant of two forces is in fact another force, so that for any two forces  there is another force . We assume commutativity, as these are forces being applied concurrently, so the order shouldn't matter .

Consider the map

If  is associative, then this map will be linear. Thus  must be equivalent to the normal vector addition operator.

Controversy
The mathematical proof of the parallelogram of force is not generally accepted to be mathematically valid. Various proofs were developed (chiefly Duchayla's and Poisson's), and these also caused objections. That the parallelogram of force was true was not questioned, but why it was true. Today the parallelogram of force is accepted as an empirical fact, non-reducible to Newton's first principles.

See also
Newton's Mathematical Principles of Natural Philosophy, Axioms or Laws of Motion, Corollary I, at Wikisource
Vector (geometric)
Net force

References 

Force
Vector calculus